The Division of Kingsford Smith is an Australian electoral division in the state of New South Wales.

History

The division is named after Sir Charles Kingsford Smith, a pioneer aviator, and the first pilot to fly across the Pacific Ocean. The Kingsford Smith International Airport (Sydney International), and the suburb of Kingsford, both of which are located within the division, are also named after him. The division was proclaimed at the redistribution of 11 May 1949, and was first contested at the 1949 federal election.

Kingsford Smith has been in Labor hands for its entire existence. A redistribution ahead of the 1969 election made it one of the safest Labor seats in both Sydney and the nation, and it remained a comfortably safe Labor seat for most of the next four decades. However, demographic changes since 2010 have made the seat much less secure for Labor. It has previously been held by Lionel Bowen, a minister in the Whitlam government, Deputy Leader of the Labor Party from 1977 to 1990 and Deputy Prime Minister for most of the Hawke government, and by Laurie Brereton, a minister in the Keating government. It was then held by Peter Garrett, a former lead singer of the Australian rock band Midnight Oil, former President of the Australian Conservation Foundation, and a minister in the Rudd and Gillard governments. Garrett announced his retirement on 26 June 2013.

The Division was originally known as the Division of Kingsford-Smith (with a hyphen), based upon a misspelling of Sir Charles's surname. However, this was corrected at the redistribution in 2001.

The current Member for Kingsford Smith, since the 2013 federal election, is Matt Thistlethwaite, a member of the Australian Labor Party who resigned from the Senate prior to the election.

Boundaries
Since 1984, federal electoral division boundaries in Australia have been determined at redistributions by a redistribution committee appointed by the Australian Electoral Commission. Redistributions occur for the boundaries of divisions in a particular state, and they occur every seven years, or sooner if a state's representation entitlement changes or when divisions of a state are malapportioned.

The division is located in the Eastern Suburbs of Sydney, on the north shore of Botany Bay, and the coast of the Tasman Sea. The division includes the suburbs of Banksmeadow, Botany, Chifley, Coogee, Daceyville, East Botany, Eastgardens, Eastlakes, Hillsdale, Kensington, Kingsford, La Perouse, Little Bay, Malabar, Maroubra, Maroubra Junction, Mascot, Matraville, Pagewood, Phillip Bay, Port Botany, and South Coogee; as well as parts of Clovelly, Randwick, and Rosebery. Bare Island, Prince Henry Hospital, and the University of New South Wales are also located in the electorate.

Members

Election results

References

External links
 Division of Kingsford Smith - Australian Electoral Commission

Electoral divisions of Australia
Constituencies established in 1949
1949 establishments in Australia